Norman John Warren (25 June 1942 – 11 March 2021) was an English film director best known for such 1970s horror films as Satan's Slave (1976), Prey (1977) and Terror (1978). Warren is also known for sex comedies such as Outer Touch (also known as Outer Spaced and Spaced Out, 1979).

Along with the films of Pete Walker, Warren's movies are sometimes dubbed "New Wave" British horror, on the basis that they upped the ante in terms of sexual explicitness and gore from that of the Hammer and Amicus productions that dominated the genre in UK cinema up to the early 1970s.

Life and career
An avid film fan from childhood, Warren entered the film industry as a runner on The Millionairess (1960) and as an assistant director (The Dock Brief, 1962) before directing the short film Fragment (1965). Calcutta-born Bachoo Sen (1934–2002), owner of the Astral Cinema in Brewer Street, London, who had an interest in film production, saw Fragment and subsequently hired Warren to direct two feature-length sex films, Her Private Hell (1968) and Loving Feeling (1969). Both were successes, but Warren saw little of the profits.

Not wanting to be typecast as a director of sex films, Warren turned down a third directing offer from Sen (Love Is a Splendid Illusion, 1970) and had to wait several years to raise the money required to make Satan's Slave (1976), the first of a series of horror films that he directed. Warren's final two films, Bloody New Year and Gunpowder (both 1987), were hampered by low budgets imposed by producer Maxine Julius.

Although Warren did not release a feature film between 1987 and 2016, he continued to work in the industry directing music videos and educational short films such as Person to Person, a BBC film designed for students of English. His horror films developed a following, culminating in the making of Evil Heritage, a 1999 documentary about his work, and the release of a DVD box set in 2004.

In 2007, Warren worked on the supplementary features for the Region 1 DVD releases of Corridors of Blood (1958), The Haunted Strangler (1958) and First Man into Space (1959). He was a regular guest at Manchester's Festival of Fantastic Films.

In 2016, Warren announced whilst being interviewed by journalist Steve Green that he was in post-production on a new feature film, a thriller set in London's Chinatown. The completion of Susu was confirmed at Birmingham FearFest in May 2017, at which Warren was a guest of honour.

Death
Warren died on 11 March 2021, aged 78. His manager said he had been in poor health for a year prior.

Filmography

References

Bibliography
 Gods In Polyester, or, a Survivors' Account of 70's Cinema Obscura (2004, Succubus Press) (contributed pieces on Satan's Slave, Prey, Terror and Inseminoid)
 Gods In Spandex, or, a Survivors' Account of 80's Cinema Obscura (2007, Succubus Press) (contributed pieces on Bloody New Year and Gunpowder)

External links

Blood, Breasts, Beasts and British Cinema: an Interview with Cult Film Director Norman J. Warren at Rock! Shock! Pop!
Interview at Fangoria.com, Part 1
Interview at Fangoria.com, Part 2
Norman J. Warren Interviewed At Rock! Shock! Pop!
Interview at CinemaNocturna.com
Interview at EatMyBrains.com
Interview at HollywoodInvestigator.com
Podcast (MP3)

1942 births
2021 deaths
English film directors
English film editors
English film producers
English male non-fiction writers
English music video directors
English non-fiction writers
Horror film directors
People from Hammersmith
Writers from London
Film directors from London
Film producers from London
21st-century British non-fiction writers
21st-century English male writers